In mathematics, the Berry–Robbins problem asks whether there is a continuous map from configurations of n points in R3 to the flag manifold U(n)/Tn that is compatible with the action of the symmetric group on n points.

See also
Atiyah conjecture on configurations

References

Lie groups